Asha Bhushal (Nepali: आशा भुषाल) is a Nepali actress and model born in Kathmandu District, Nepal.

About and career 
Asha Bhushal is a Nepali actress and model in the Nepali movie industry. She started her acting career from a television serial sunaulo bihani and her debut movie is Dusbani Nepali Movie. Her Sunpani movie was selected for Oscar awards also. She was awarded the National capital award and Himalayan international awards also.

References 

Actors from Kathmandu
Nepalese film actresses
Nepalese television actresses
Actresses in Nepali cinema
Actresses in Nepali television
21st-century Nepalese actresses
Nepalese female models
Living people
Year of birth missing (living people)